The 1974 United States Senate election in Kansas took place on November 5, 1974. Incumbent Republican U.S. Senator Bob Dole was narrowly re-elected to a second term in office.

Dole was considered vulnerable due to his close association with President Richard Nixon as chairman of the Republican National Committee in 1971 and 1972. In what would be the closest election of his 35-year Congressional career, Dole won his second term by just 13,533 votes over Democrat William R. Roy, a Topeka physician and two-term U.S. Representative. 

Kansas itself has not been represented by a Democrat in the Senate since 1939, when George McGill lost re-election. Roy's 1.7 percent margin of loss in the election is the closest the Democrats have come in winning one of the state's Senate seats.

Democratic primary

Candidates
 George Hart, former Kansas Treasurer and perennial candidate from Wichita
 William R. Roy, U.S. Representative from Topeka

Results

General election

See also 
 1974 United States Senate elections

References

1974
Kansas
United States Senate
Bob Dole